Air Ocean Airlines was a Ukrainian scheduled domestic airline based at Kyiv-Zhuliany.

History
The airline was established in September 2020. The maiden flight was performed on 30 October 2021. 

On 15 January 2022, the airline suspended all flights with a planned resumption on 15 March 2022. However, in the same time the Ukrainian authorities suspended the airline's operational license until further notice. Given the invasion that started on 24 February, the future of the airline is extremely uncertain.

Destinations
As of January 2022, Air Ocean Airlines operated flights to the following destinations:
Ukraine

Kharkiv - Kharkiv International Airport
Kyiv - Kyiv International Airport (Zhuliany)
Lviv - Lviv Danylo Halytskyi International Airport
Zaporizhzhia - Zaporizhzhia International Airport

Fleet

As of November 2021, Air Ocean Airlines operated the following aircraft:

See also
 List of airlines of Ukraine

References

External links
 

Defunct airlines of Ukraine
Airlines established in 2020
Airlines disestablished in 2022
2020 establishments in Ukraine
2022 disestablishments in Ukraine